Heads Are Gonna Roll is the second album by the Los Angeles, California ska band The Hippos, released in 1999 by Interscope Records. It was the band's first album for a major record label and was their most successful, with the single "Wasting My Life" receiving some airplay on rock radio stations in the United States. Musically the album found the band transitioning from the ska-based structure of their debut album to a more pop-rock sound, using fewer ska rhythms and instead incorporating synthesizers. It includes a new version of the song "Far Behind" from their debut album Forget the World. The album's art is a reference to The Animals' self-titled album.

Heads Are Gonna Roll was The Hippos' last proper album as a committed band. Although they would continue to perform and record over the next few years, they did not release any other albums until the posthumous The Hippos in 2003, after quietly disbanding.

Track listing

Performers
Ariel Rechtshaid - vocals, guitar, synthesizer
James Bairian - bass
Louis Castle - trumpet, backing vocals
Rich Zahniser - trombone, Moog synthesizer, Farfisa organ, keyboards
Danny Rukasin - trombone
Kyle Briggs - drums, percussion

Album information
Record label: Interscope Records
Produced by and engineered by Mark Trombino except "Always Something There to Remind Me" produced by Chris Fudurich, Ariel Rechtshaid, and Rich Zahniser and engineered by Chris Fudurich
Additional engineers: Jordan D'Aleffio, Dale Lawton, Robert Read, Billy Bowers, Brian Foxworthy, and Nick Raskaulincez
Recorded at Mad Hatter in Silver Lake, California, Sound City in Van Nuys, California, The Music Box in Hollywood, California, The Complex in west Los Angeles, California, and Chateau Chaumont in Hollywood, California
Mixed by Phil Nicolo at Studio 4 in Conshohocken, Pennsylvania
Mix engineer: Dirk Grobelny
Mastered by Stephen Marcussen at A&M Mastering Studios in Hollywood, California
Digitally edited by Andrew Garver
All songs written by Ariel Rechtshaid except "All Alone" by Louis Castle and Ariel Rechtshaid, "Far Behind" by Rich Zahniser, Louis Castle, and Ariel Rechtshaid, and "Always Something There to Remind Me" by Hal David and Burt Bacharach
Photos by Rocky Schenck
Art direction and design by Francesca Restrepo

References

The Hippos albums
1999 albums
Albums produced by Mark Trombino
Albums recorded at Sound City Studios